Akanni-Sunday Wasiu (born 18 March 1984) is a Nigerian professional footballer who plays  as a forward for Malaysia Super League club Negeri Sembilan.

He has played for clubs in Poland, Lithuania, England, Malta, China and Vietnam in his career.

Club career
Sunday began his career in Poland with Szczakowianka Jaworzno, where he made 27 appearances, scoring 3 goals, before moving to Lithuania to play for FC Vilnius in 2006. During his time in Lithuania, he made 15 appearances, scoring 1 goal, before deciding to try his luck in England in 2007, signing for non-league St Albans City. He impressed at Clarence Park, bagging 3 goals in 12 appearances before pitching up on trial with Colchester United on trial during the summer of 2008, where he eventually earned himself a one-year deal.

A pacy and powerful striker, Akanni-Sunday Wasiu joined Luton Town on a month's loan from Colchester United in mid-January 2009, having been a long-term target for Hatters boss Mick Harford. He scored once in five games for Luton before his loan deal expired.

After the 2008–2009 season, Akanni-Sunday Wasiu was released by Paul Lambert and Colchester United after failing to make an impression on the first team.

Sunday joined Floriana on 28 August 2009; his debut came the following day in a 0–6 loss against rivals Valletta. His second appearance for the club was a more pleasant experience, as he netted his first goal in the 1–1 draw against Tarxien. The powerful striker fast became a fan favourite at the club and was voted as the Man Of the Match on three occasions by the Maltese journalists. In 13 matches with the Greens' Wasiu netted no less than 7 goals.

From the 2010 season he switched to playing for Chinese football team Changsha Ginde before moving to Shenyang Dongjin in 2011. In 2012, he returned to Floriana in Malta.

In September 2014 he returned to England to play for Whitehawk.

2016–2017 season 
In December 2016, Sunday signed a one-year contract with Malaysia Premier League club UITM F.C. There, he scored a total of 29 goals. Nine goals for Malaysian Cup and 20 goals for the Premiere League.

2017–2019 season 
On 7 December 2017, signed a one-year contract with Malaysia Premier League club Terengganu II.

2019–2020 season 
After 2 seasons with Malaysia Premier League club Terengganu II, Sunday was offered to be the striker for Malaysia Premier League club UKM

References

External links

Profile at SoccerTerminal

Living people
1984 births
Nigerian footballers
Nigerian expatriate footballers
English Football League players
Association football forwards
FC Vilnius players
Colchester United F.C. players
Luton Town F.C. players
Floriana F.C. players
Changsha Ginde players
Nigerian expatriate sportspeople in Malta
Expatriate footballers in China
Nigerian expatriate sportspeople in China
Whitehawk F.C. players
St Albans City F.C. players
Expatriate footballers in Malta
Shenyang Dongjin players
Chinese Super League players
China League One players
UiTM FC players